Godfather is the soundtrack album of the 2012 Kannada drama film of the same name, directed by cinematographer-turned-director Sethu Sriram, starring actor Upendra in a triple role. The soundtrack album consists of eight songs composed by Academy Award-winning composer A. R. Rahman, and lyrics penned by K. Kalyan, Devappa Hassan and Kaviraj. The background score of the film is composed by Rajesh Ramanath. Rahman retained most of the tracks from the original version, which also featured musical score by him. The audio was launched in a grand manner at Chancery Hotel, Bengaluru on 13 June 2012. The album received positive critical reception upon release.

Development
Cinematographer P. C. Sreeram insisted his longtime friend A. R. Rahman to compose the music for the film. Rahman retained most of his compositions from the Tamil version and composed one fresh track for the Kannada version, "Aalapane Mellane". The soundtrack features eight songs; five have lyrics penned by K. Kalyan, one by Devappa Hassan, Kaviraj and Blaaze. Considering the budget limitations of the Kannada film industry, the composer hardly accepted any remuneration for the project. A crore expenditure was accounted for the studio, artists, instruments, recording and re-recording. The score was completed in a span of six months.
The melancholic song "Laali Laali Amma" crooned by Naresh Iyer, describes a mother-son relationship, sang from a perspective of a son who loves his mother and is willing to support and protect her all her life. This song features Upendra and Catherine Tresa in their respective roles. The song with classical melodies is based on Raagas Charukesi, Sarasangi. The track titled "Sarigama Sangamave" is based on the raaga Udayaravichandrika. The tune of this track is adapted from the track "Nannede Shruthiyalli". The song "Ee Mani" is a duck mix while Upendra wake-ups and dances in the early morning at his room. The songs "Deepavali" and "Neene Ee Kanna" are not featured in the film.

Release
Initially, the audio launch was scheduled on 1 June 2012 on Palace Grounds, Bengaluru but was postponed due to "India closed". The audio launch was held in a grand manner in Chancery Hotel, Bengaluru on 13 June 2012. While the music composer made an appearance at the event, the cast and crew of the film, veteran actor Ambareesh, top composers and lyricists of the Kannada film industry were also present at the occasion. Singers Vijay Prakash, Swetha Mohan and Naresh Iyer each performed one song live at the event. The audio rights were acquired by Samartha Ventures' label Ashwini Media Networks. The soundtrack album received generally positive reviews from critics. Rahman was nominated for the Best Music Director category in the 2nd SIIMA Awards.

Critical reception
The soundtrack album received positive critical reception. MusicAloud commented that the soundtrack as usual is a great piece from Rahman, particularly praising the songs "Laali Laali Amma", "Nannede Shruthiyalli", "Sarigama Sangamave" and "Neene Ee Kanna", stating that the tunes were unique for Kannada soundtracks generally, thus giving it a rating 9 out of 10. Indiaglitz stated that it is a great album, yet it is missing some core ingredients of Kannada film songs, especially noting the uniqueness of the song "Sanchari Manasu", which lacks the Sandalwood touch of music, giving the album a rating of 3.5 out of 5. OneIndia stated, "A R Rahman has given a good album, which might not go well with the masses. Especially, for those who are used to the Bhat and Harikrishna's kind of music, the album might just appear to be very minor, as the strength of the album is classical or slow songs. In fact, it has gone against the current trend. However, the songs Nannede Shruthiyalli, Sarigama Sangamave and Neene Ee Kanna are very nice and pleasant to hear."

Track listing
The complete track listing was revealed on A. R. Rahman's official website on 28 May 2012. All lyrics written by K. Kalyan, except where noted.

Personnel
Backing Vocals
Nannede Shruthiyalli – Ghulam Murtaza Khan, Ghulam Qadir Khan, Renuka, Pooja, Prof. Srini on Hindustani bols and Srinivas on Sollukattu
Deepavali (Kids Chorus) – Sai, Vignesh, Shyam, Jakshman, Rishi
 
Personnel
Mridangam – Seenu
Ghatam – Karthik
Pakhawaj – Sreeni, Yograj
 
Sound engineers

Suresh Perumal, Hentry Kuruvilla, Srinidhi Venkatesh, Jerry Vincent, Pradeep, Kannan Ganpat, Karthik, Dinesh Ramalingam
 
Mixing and mastering

S. Sivakumar

Additional mixing

T. R. Krishna Chetan
 
Vocal Supervision

V. J. Srinivasa Murthy, Srinivas Doraisamy
 
Musician's fixer

R. Samidurai

Accolades

See also 
Godfather
A. R. Rahman discography

References

External links

A. R. Rahman soundtracks
2012 soundtrack albums
Kannada film soundtracks